Charles Sheehan-Miles (born Atlanta, Georgia, United States, 1971) is an American writer and veterans' advocate.

Sheehan-Miles grew up in Atlanta. He served in the United States Army in the 1991 Persian Gulf War as a tank crewman in the 24th Infantry Division and was decorated for valor for helping rescue fellow tank crewmen from a burning tank during the Battle of Rumaila.

After the Gulf War, he became affiliated with numerous advocacy organizations, including serving as executive director of the National Gulf War Resource Center, as executive director of the Nuclear Policy Research Institute (an organization founded by Helen Caldicott), as a board member at the Education for Peace in Iraq Center and as the founder/executive director of Veterans for Common Sense.

He is the author of multiple novels:

Prayer at Rumayla (2001), released under a creative commons license in 2007.
Republic: A Novel of America's Future (2007)
Insurgent: Book 2 of America's Future (2012)
Just Remember to Breathe (2012)
A Song for Julia (2012)
The Last Hour (2013)
Nocturne (2013) (with Andrea Randall)
Falling Stars (2013)
Girl of Lies (2013)
Girl of Rage (2014)
Girl of Vengeance (2014)

Several of his novels have been translated into multiple languages.

References

"Mental Health and Military Service in Iraq". The Diane Rehm Show. March 6, 2006.
"Fit To Kill". CNN Presents. 2005. interview with Sheehan-Miles.
"Civilians Working for U.S. Military Gunned Down in Kuwait". Wolf Blitzer Reports. CNN. January 21, 2003. interview with Sheehan-Miles.
"Fictional nightmare, or a prophecy about our future?". Daily Kos. June 24, 2007.
"Meria with Charles Sheehan-Miles - Veterans for Common Sense & the News". Meria Heller. September 15, 2004.
Yabanci Yayinlari - Juli̇a’nin Şarkisi. 
Interview.  All Things Considered. November 11, 2009.
"August 5, 1995". Washington Journal, C-SPAN, August 5, 1995.
"Charles Sheehan-Miles". Goodreads profile.
"Veterans' Voices: Returning Home From The Gulf War". All Things Considered. NPR. November 11, 2009
"Is United States Closer to War With Iraq?". Connie Chung Tonight. CNN. December 9, 2002.
"Iraq: Profiles in Protest". Time. December 16, 2002.

External links

1971 births
Living people
United States Army personnel of the Gulf War
United States Army soldiers
20th-century American male writers